The Kingsburg Joint Union High School District is a school district located in Kingsburg, Fresno County, California.  Its primary school is Kingsburg High School.

External links
Kingsburg Joint Union High School District website
Fresno County Office of Education website

School districts in Fresno County, California